Government in Queensland is delivered by a number of agencies, grouped under areas of portfolio responsibility. Each portfolio is led by a government minister who is a member of the Parliament of Queensland, appointed by the Governor as the representative of the Crown.

The agencies are principally grouped as eight departments, each led by a secretary or director-general and comprising a number of portfolios covering specific policy areas across the department and allocated statutory authorities, trading enterprises, boards, councils and other public bodies.

Agencies have varying levels of operational autonomy, and deliver one or more of frontline public services, administrative functions and law enforcement. Some are structured as for-profit corporations. Where there are multiple portfolios within a department, directors-general may be accountable to a number of ministers. In addition to the list below, a range of other agencies support the functions of the departments. The government is responsible for a number of corporations, of which the responsible minister typically holds a 100% ownership stake in. In 2006, Premier Peter Beattie privatised a number of government owned electricity retailers. On 2 June 2009 the government announced the 'Renewing Queensland Plan' that would sell state-owned railway, port and forestry assets to raise $15 billion, and avoid a further $12 billion required in future capital investment. On 18 May 2010, Queensland Forestry Plantations was the first commercial business to be sold.

All agencies are identifiable by their corporate logo, which features in agency advertising, publications and correspondence, pictured right.

A list of articles on Queensland government agencies sorted alphabetically is available at Government agencies of Queensland. The Queensland Government maintains a list of agencies and their contact details at its website.

Premier and Cabinet
 Department of the Premier and Cabinet

Agriculture and Fisheries 
 Department of Agriculture and Fisheries

Children, Youth Justice and Multicultural Affairs 

 Department of Children, Youth Justice and Multicultural Affairs

Communities, Housing and Digital Economy 

 Department of Communities, Housing and Digital Economy
 Queensland State Archives
 Queensland Housing Commission
Residential Tenancies Authority

Corrective Services 

 Queensland Corrective Services

Education 
 Department of Education

Employment, Small Business and Training 

 Department of Employment, Small Business and Training

Energy and Public Works 

 Department of Energy and Public Works

Environment and Science 
Department of Environment and Science
Department of Environment and Heritage Protection
Environmental Protection Agency (Queensland)
Queensland Heritage Council

Police & Fire and Emergency Services 

 Queensland Police Service
 Queensland Fire and Emergency Services

Health 
 Queensland Health
Forensic and Scientific Services
Psychologists Board of Queensland
Queensland Ambulance Service

Justice and Attorney-General 
 Department of Justice and Attorney-General

Crime and Corruption Commission
Electoral Commission of Queensland
Legal Aid Queensland
Legal Services Commissioner
Office of Liquor and Gaming Regulation
Queensland Human Rights Commission
Queensland Law Reform Commissioner
Office of the Director of Public Prosecutions
Office of the Information Commissioner
Office of the Public Guardian
Office of the Queensland Ombudsman 
Parole Boards
The Public Advocate
The Public Trustee
Prostitution Licensing Authority

Public Service Commission 

 Public Service Commission

Regional Development, Manufacturing and Water 

 Department of Regional Development, Manufacturing and Water

Resources 

 Department of Resources
 CS Energy
 Energex
 Ergon
 LinkWater
 Powerlink Queensland
 Queensland Urban Utilities
 Queensland Water Commission
 SEQ Water Grid Manager
 Seqwater 
 SunWater
 Tarong Energy
 WaterSecure

Seniors, Disability Services and Aboriginal and Torres Strait Islander Partnerships 
 Department of Seniors, Disability Services and Aboriginal and Torres Strait Islander Partnerships

State Development, Infrastructure, Local Government and Planning 
 Department of State Development, Infrastructure, Local Government and Planning
 State Government Insurance Office (Queensland)

Tourism, Innovation and Sport 
 Department of Tourism, Innovation and Sport 
Tourism and Events Queensland
Queensland Parks and Wildlife Service
Office of Liquor and Gaming Regulation

Transport and Main Roads 
 Department of Transport and Main Roads
 Cairns Port Authority
 Mackay Port Authority
 Maritime Safety Queensland
 Port of Brisbane
 Port of Townsville
 Ports Corporation of Queensland
 QConnect
 Queensland Rail

Treasury 

 Queensland Treasury
Motor Accident Insurance Commission and Nominal Defendant 
Office of Government Owned Corporations
Office of Industrial Relations
Office of State Revenue
Queensland Competition Authority
Queensland Investment Corporation
Queensland Treasury Corporation
South Bank Corporation
Stanwell Corporation

See also

Government of Queensland
Defunct government agencies of Queensland

References

 *
Lists of government agencies in Australia
Government agencies